Sarnau railway station served the village of Bancyfelin, Carmarthenshire, Wales; it was close to the hamlet of Sarnau. It was on the West Wales Line.

History

The station opened on 2 January 1854.

The station closed on 15 June 1964.

Routes

References

External links
Sarnau Station on navigable 1946 O.S. map

Disused railway stations in Carmarthenshire
Former Great Western Railway stations
Railway stations in Great Britain opened in 1854
Railway stations in Great Britain closed in 1964
Beeching closures in Wales